Mahasarakham Province Stadium is a multi-purpose stadium in  Maha Sarakham Province, Thailand. It is currently used mostly for football matches and is the home stadium of Mahasarakham United F.C. The stadium holds 3,000 people.

References

Football venues in Thailand
Multi-purpose stadiums in Thailand
Buildings and structures in Mahasarakham province